Derrick-Philippe B. J., Baron Gosselin (1956) is a Belgian engineer and economist. He is chairman of the Belgian Nuclear Sciences Research Center SCK CEN, vice-chairman of Belgonucleaire and vice-chairman of the Royal Higher Institute for Defence (RHID). He is on the board of the Von Karman Institute.

Education 

Gosselin holds degrees in engineering, economics and business administration at Ghent University and a degree in international policy and defence sciences at the Royal Higher Institute for Defence  (RHID) of the Royal Military Academy (Belgium). He undertook postgraduate education at Vlerick Business School, University of Oxford (Green Templeton College), London Business School, Harvard Business School and INSEAD.

Academic career 

Gosselin is an associate fellow of Green Templeton College and Oxford Martin School, at the University of Oxford. He is a member of the Energy Steering Panel of the European Academies' Science Advisory Council (EASAC). He is since 2021 emeritus professor of strategy at the School of Economics (Faculty of Economics and Business Administration) Ghent University.

Gosselin is chairman of SCK CEN since 2013, a member of the board of governors of the Royal Higher Institute for Defence (RHID) since 2014 and its vice-chairman since 2021. He is on the board of trustees and former vice-chairman of the von Karman Institute for Fluid Dynamics since 2015.

He is an elected Fellow of the Royal Flemish Academy of Belgium for Science and the Arts (KVAB), the Royal Academy for Overseas Sciences and Academia Europaea. He is a Hon. Fellow of High Hill College (Hogenheuvel College) (2007–2009) at Katholieke Universiteit Leuven.

He was a member of the Global Future Councils of the World Economic Forum and was a board member of the European Council of Applied Sciences and Engineering (Euro-CASE) (2008–2011). He is the founder and former president of Flanders Business School (1999–2004).
His research focuses on decision making in highly complex and uncertain situations (Wicked problems, Futures Studies and Complexity theory). 

He is the Hon. Chair (Senior Member) of the Oxford University Belgo-Luxembourgish Society OUBLS.

Government career 
He is Hon. Head of Cabinet (2009–2012) of the prime minister of the Flemish government. Author and architect of the New Industrial Policy for Flanders including the setup of an Industrial Transformations Fund (PMV-TINA). He was also a government commissioner for the Agency for Innovation by Science and Technology of Flanders (IWT). At the beginning of his career, he worked as an attaché in the Department for Science Policy Planning, now Belspo, within the Office of the Belgian Prime Minister.

Business career 

Together with Julien De Wilde and John J. Goossens, Gosselin joined the Alcatel-Lucent group in 1990 as a member of the executive committee. From 2002 till 2009 he was executive vice president of the international energy branch of Suez, now Engie group. He started his business career at Arthur Andersen.

Honours 

  Grand Officer in the Order of Leopold.
  Grand Officer in the Order of the Crown.

  Knight in the National Order of the Legion of Honour.
  Officer in the Ordre national du Mérite.

References

Sources
De Standaard 26 November 2008 - Klassieke managers kunnen crisis niet aan
Knowledge@Wharton 22 July 2009: Eyes Wide Open: Embracing Uncertainty through Scenario Planning

External links 
 Gosselin - Ghent University
 Derrick-Philippe Gosselin - UGent Memoralis
 Derrick Gosselin - University of Oxford - Oxford Martin School

Belgian businesspeople
Ghent University alumni
Alumni of Green Templeton College, Oxford

Recipients of the Legion of Honour
Officiers of the Ordre des Palmes Académiques
Officers of the Ordre national du Mérite
Barons of Belgium
1956 births
Living people